Tell Addus is an archaeological site 5 km northwest of Baalbek in the Beqaa Mohafazat (Governorate). It dates at least to the Early Bronze Age.

References

Baalbek District
Neolithic settlements
Bronze Age sites in Lebanon